In enzymology, a CDP-diacylglycerol—glycerol-3-phosphate 3-phosphatidyltransferase is an enzyme that catalyzes the chemical reaction

CDP-diacylglycerol + sn-glycerol 3-phosphate  CMP + 3(3-sn-phosphatidyl)-sn-glycerol 1-phosphate

Thus, the two substrates of this enzyme are CDP-diacylglycerol and sn-glycerol 3-phosphate, whereas its two products are CMP and 3(3-sn-phosphatidyl)-sn-glycerol 1-phosphate.

This enzyme belongs to the family of transferases, specifically those transferring non-standard substituted phosphate groups. This enzyme participates in glycerophospholipid metabolism.

References

 
 

EC 2.7.8
Enzymes of unknown structure